Heteromyia prattii is a species of biting midges in the family Ceratopogonidae from eastern North America.

References

Further reading

External links

 

Ceratopogonidae
Diptera of North America
Insects described in 1902
Taxa named by Daniel William Coquillett
Articles created by Qbugbot